Process of Elimination is a 1998 young adult mystery novel by Carolyn Keene. It is the final novel of the Nancy Drew and Hardy Boys Supermystery crossover series.

Plot summary
Nancy and Bess join many from all over the world to participate in a Los Angeles conference concerning the environment, but they soon get involved in investigating the murder of Carl Dubchek, a conference supervisor. Meanwhile, the Hardys witness the strange and unorthodox theft of multiple bamboo plants from the San Diego Zoo, and uncover a connection to the conference.

References

External links
Process of Elimination at Fantastic Fiction
Supermystery series books

Supermystery
1998 American novels
1998 children's books
Novels set in Los Angeles